Excelsior Springs Hall of Waters Commercial West Historic District is a national historic district located at Excelsior Springs, Clay County, Missouri.  It encompasses 20 contributing buildings in the central business district of Excelsior Springs. The district developed between about 1894 and 1948, and includes representative examples of Victorian, Classical Revival, and Art Deco style architecture.  Notable buildings include the Excelsior Springs Post Office (1914), McCleary Thornton-Minor Hospital (c. 1910), Montgomery Ward Building (1929), J.J. Newberry Company Building (c. 1929), J.C. Penney Company Building (c. 1929), Elks Lodge No. 1001 (c. 1913-1926), Washington Hotel and Orpheus Theatre (c. 1900-1905), I.O.O.F. Building (1913-1917), Arlington Hotel (1899-1900), and Ideal Hotel (c. 1900-1905).

It was listed on the National Register of Historic Places in 1999.

References

Historic districts on the National Register of Historic Places in Missouri
Victorian architecture in Missouri
Neoclassical architecture in Missouri
Art Deco architecture in Missouri
Buildings and structures in Clay County, Missouri
National Register of Historic Places in Clay County, Missouri